Jean-Pierre Godefroy (born 23 September 1944) is a member of the Senate of France, representing the Manche department.  He is a member of the Socialist Party.

References
Page on the Senate website

1944 births
Living people
Politicians from Normandy
French Senators of the Fifth Republic
Socialist Party (France) politicians
Mayors of places in Normandy
Senators of Manche
People from Loire-Atlantique